Areeb Zuaiter ( June 17, 1980) is a Palestinian director and a multinational visual storyteller.

Training 

Zuaiter was born in Nablus, Palestine but her family moved to Saudi Arabia when she was two months old. She initially took up painting before becoming interested in film making.

In 1997 she moved to Lebanon to continue her education then she moved to United States in 2010.

Career 

Areeb Zuaiter led the Regional Training Department at the Royal Film Commission - Jordan and has served as head of film programming for the Amman International Film Festival.

Zuaiter spent a year at the National Museum of American History as a Goldman Sachs Film and Video Fellow where she produced some of the Museum's key film projects.

Between 2016 and 2018, Zuaiter served on the evaluation committees for the Rawi Screenwriters Lab, the Film Prize of the Robert Bosch Stiftung and Med Film Factory.

Zuaiter currently teaches Visual Literacy, Media Production II and History of Documentary at American University's School of Communication and Howard University's Cathy Hughes School of Communications.

Film work 

Zuaiter has directed the short film "Stained," which won the Jury Prize at the European Film Festival in Lebanon, and the documentary Colors of Resistance, which won the London Independent Film Awards Best Documentary Short at the London Independent Film Festival in 2019.

With regards to her film work, Zuaiter creates works focused on Palestine and said she is "presenting, preserving and protecting people who can no longer find their city on a map."

Education 
Areeb studied at the Lebanese American University, she have bachelors of Architecture in Interior Architecture, bachelors of Art in Communication Arts, she also studied at the American University, and she have a Master's degree in Film and Video Production, School of Communication

Documentaries 

 Colors of Resistance
 Yalla Parkour

Awards 

 Around International Film Festival

 London Independent Film Awards

References

Living people
Palestinian academics
Palestinian film directors
Palestinian women film directors
Palestinian documentary film directors
Year of birth missing (living people)